Beautempsia is a genus of flowering plants belonging to the family Capparaceae.

Its native range is Ecuador to Peru.

Species:

Beautempsia avicenniifolia

References

Capparaceae
Brassicales genera